Sam Colangelo (born December 26, 2001) is an American collegiate ice hockey forward who is currently playing as a sophomore with Northeastern University of the Hockey East. He was selected by the Anaheim Ducks, 36th overall, in the 2020 NHL Entry Draft.

Playing career

Early life and high school
Colangelo was born on December 26, 2001, in Stoneham, Massachusetts. In high school, he attended Lawrence Academy, where he played on the ice hockey team and scored 34 goals with 70 assists.

Amateur
Colangelo played two seasons with the Chicago Steel in the United States Hockey League (USHL). In his first season, he scored just three goals. But in his second season he scored 28 goals with 30 assists. Colangelo opted for the NHL draft. 

Colangelo was drafted in the second-round, 36th overall, by the Anaheim Ducks.

Career statistics

Regular season and playoffs

International

Awards and honors

References

External links

2001 births
Living people
American people of Italian descent
Anaheim Ducks draft picks
Chicago Steel players
Northeastern Huskies men's ice hockey players